The 1944 Copa Ibarguren was the 20th. edition of this National cup of Argentina. It was played by the champions of Primera División and the winner of Copa Presidente de la Nación, a regional cup competition where Provincial Federations took part. crowned during 1944.

Boca Juniors (Primera División champion) faced Federación Tucumana de Fútbol (Copa Presidente champion) at Atlético Tucumán Stadium, located in San Miguel de Tucumán. Although both teams had won their titles in 1944, the final was played three years later, on March 23, 1947.

Qualified teams

Match details

References

i
1944 in Argentine football
1944 in South American football